Devi Dja (1914 –1989), known as Miss Dja, was an Indonesian dancer, playwright and film actor in the 1940s. A member of the Dardanella Opera group, founded by her husband, Willy A. Piedro (Willy Klimanoff), which toured the Dutch East Indies, she moved with her husband to the US around 1940, remaining there for the rest of her life as a professional entertainer and taking on American citizenship.

Early life
Misri Dja was born in Besuki in the Situbondo Regency, East Java, Indonesia on 1 August 1914. She later changed her name to Sutidjah. From a poor family, she would join her grandparents while they went around busking and begging. After going on stage when she reached her teens, she met Willy A. Piedro (born Willy Klimanoff), a Penang-born actor of Russian descent, who would later become her husband. He invited her to play in his troupe that later became known as the Dardanella Opera Group. Overcoming opposition from her family she joined the troupe, initially playing only small roles and often appearing as a dancer who appeared while scenery was being changed. Illiterate at the time she was recruited, having had no formal education, Dja began to take reading and writing lessons.

Early career
When she was 16, Dja was asked to appear in a play, replacing the lead actress who had fallen ill. By 1931 she was appearing prominently in theatrical posters as "Miss Dja: Dardanella’s Sweet Seventeen". By this time the Dardanella was booming, with the troupe having 150 members, and it made its first trip outside Indonesia, to Singapore. In the mid-1930s it travelled to China and played in several cities. This was followed with a visit to Rangoon and India, where, in May 1937, Dja danced in the presence of Jawaharlal Nehru, the future prime minister. Continuing west, with the number of members declining along the way, Dardanella performed in Turkey, Paris, Morocco and Germany. Dja became known as the Pavlova of the Orient, after the ballerina, Anna Pavlova. 

The remaining players were on the last voyage of the SS Rotterdam out of the Netherlands in 1939. In New York City they changed their name to "Devi Dja's Bali and Java Cultural Dancers", performing in restaurants in the city. Following the outbreak of World War II and the occupation of Indonesia by Japanese troops, they were unable to return home and were effectively stuck in the US. At the end of the war, she and her husband opened a nightclub in Chicago, called the Sarong Room, but it burned down in 1946. Klimanoff died in Chicago in 1952.

American citizenship
In 1947, Dja met Sutan Sjahrir who, as prime minister, was leading the Indonesian delegation to the United Nations in New York to fight for international recognition of Indonesia's independence. He introduced her to the American public as an ambassador for Indonesian culture, resulting in her name becoming increasingly known in the US. In 1951, she became an American citizen, believed to be the first Indonesian woman to be naturalized. This might have been done in order to protect her from possible deportation in light of her friendship with the Indonesian communist, Lari Bogk, who had been in the US supporting Indonesian seamen and port workers who were refusing to load supplies destined for the Dutch East Indies colonial government. After her husband's death she still performed, together with the few remaining Dardanella group members. 

She married Acee Blue Eagle, a Native American artist, but the marriage was short-lived, allegedly because he did not like her continuing to interact with Indonesians in America. After they divorced, she moved to Los Angeles, but failed to break into the movie industry, obtaining only a few bit parts, despite establishing friendships with stars such as Greta Garbo, Carry Cooper, Bob Hope, Dorothy Lamour, and Bing Crosby. Her main difficulty in getting employment was her poor spoken English. She then married an Indonesian, Ali Assan, six years her junior, with whom she had a daughter, Ratna Assan. Again, the marriage was short-lived. 

Dja continued to work in California, performing and teaching Indonesian dancing, for a time having her own dance school in the Vermont area of Los Angeles. She was represented by the agent Raymond D. Bowman who specialized in “world music” and jazz performers. When the first Indonesia president, Sukarno, visited the US she met with him and on a visit to Indonesia she was received by him at the State Palace. He tried to persuade her to give up her US citizenship, but this would have made work in the US difficult. In 1960 she teamed up with modern dance pioneer, Ruth St. Denis, to present the first Balinese shadow puppet play in the United States.

Death
Dja died of cancer in Los Angeles on 19 January 1989 and was buried in Forest Lawn Memorial Park (Hollywood Hills). Two books have been written about her: Gelombang Hidupku: Dewi Dja dari Dardanella (My Life’s Wave: Devi Dja of Dardanella) by Ramadhan Karta Hadimadja, and Standing Ovations: Devi Dja, Woman of Java by Leona Merrin. Both biographies are based on interviews with Dja.

References

Further reading

External links
I remember Devi Dja. A film by R. Christian Anderson

1914 births
1989 deaths
Indonesian female dancers
American dancers of Asian descent